Trachelipodidae is a family of woodlice, containing the following genera:

Levantoniscus Cardoso, Taiti & Sfenthourakis, 2015 (3 species)
Nagurus Holthuis, 1949 (40 species)
Pagana Budde-Lund, 1908 (5 species)
Panchaia Taiti & Ferrara, 2004 (3 species)
Porcellium Dahl, 1916 (16 species)
Socotroniscus Ferrara & Taiti, 1996 (monotypic)
Tamarida Taiti & Ferrara, 2004 (2 species)
Trachelipus Budde-Lund, 1908 (59 species)

References

 
Woodlice
Crustacean families